Darapur is a village and union council of Jhelum District in the Punjab Province of Pakistan. It is part of Jhelum Tehsil, and is located at 32°44'0N 73°33'0E with an altitude of 214 metres (705 feet). Most of the population belong to the Araian, Awan, Jatt and janjua tribe.

References

Union councils of Jhelum District
Populated places in Jhelum District